Henry Rudolph Immerwahr (born February 28, 1916, in Breslau, then Germany, died September 15, 2013, in Chapel Hill, North Carolina) was a German-born American Classicist known for his work on Attic scripts and Greek epigraphy.

Life 
The eldest son of Kurt Immerwahr and Johanna Freund Immerwahr, he was educated at the University of Florence (1934-1938). Immerwahr then emigrated to the United States, earned a Ph.D. at Yale University in 1942 and then performed military service for three years during World War II. He returned to Yale after the war and taught there until 1957, at which point he moved to the University of North Carolina. Immerwahr served as Professor of Greek in the Department of Classics at the University of North Carolina at Chapel Hill from 1957 until his retirement in 1977, at which point he became Director of the American School of Classical Studies at Athens, serving in that capacity until 1982.

Immerwahr received a Guggenheim fellowship to study at the American School of Classical Studies at Athens in 1946.

He was married to the archaeologist Sara Anderson Immerwahr.

Scholarship
 1966. Form and thought in Herodotus. Cleveland, Published for the American Philological Association [Chapel Hill, N.C.] by the Press of Western Reserve University.
 1990. Attic Script: a Survey. Oxford: Clarendon Press.
 2009. Corpus of Attic vase inscriptions. 2nd ed.

Necrology
 Stadter, Philip A. "HENRY R. IMMERWAHR†" Gnomon 86. Bd., H. 2 (2014), p. 191 (1 page)

References

External links
 
 
 

1916 births
2013 deaths
University of North Carolina at Chapel Hill faculty
German classical scholars
Classical scholars of the University of North Carolina at Chapel Hill